Cizur Menor is a locality and council located in the municipality of Cizur, in Navarre province, Spain, Spain. As of 2020, it has a population of 2498.

Geography 
Cizur Menor is located 5km south-southwest of Pamplona.

References

Populated places in Navarre